Aclytia bractea is a moth of the family Erebidae. It was described by Heinrich Benno Möschler in 1877. It is found in Suriname.

References

Moths described in 1877
Aclytia
Fauna of Suriname
Moths of South America